George Jordan (1847 – October 24, 1904) was a Buffalo Soldier in the United States Army and a recipient of America's highest military decoration—the Medal of Honor—for his actions in the Indian Wars of the western United States.

Biography
Jordan joined the Army from Nashville, Tennessee after the Civil War, initially joining the 38th Infantry. By 1880 was serving as a Sergeant in Company K of the 9th Cavalry Regiment in New Mexico. On May 7, 1890, he was awarded the Medal of Honor for his actions at the Battle of Tularosa on May 14, 1880, and at Carrizo Canyon on August 12, 1881. He was also awarded the Certificate of Merit for his actions at the Carrizo Canyon engagement, which brought with it an additional $2 a month in extra pay.

In 1887, Jordan was commended by the commander at Fort Robinson for capturing an escaped prisoner. Jordan reached the rank of First Sergeant before leaving the Army in 1897. After retirement, he lived in a community with fellow Buffalo soldiers in Crawford, Nebraska. He died in 1904 and was buried in Fort McPherson National Cemetery, Maxwell, Nebraska.

Medal of Honor citation
Rank and organization: Sergeant, Company K, 9th U.S. Cavalry. Place and date: At Fort Tularosa, N. Mex., May 14, 1880; at Carrizo Canyon, N. Mex., August 12, 1881. Entered service at: Nashville, Tenn. Birth: Williamson County, Tenn. Date of issue: May 7, 1890.

Citation:

While commanding a detachment of 25 men at Fort Tularosa, N. Mex., repulsed a force of more than 100 Indians. At Carrizo Canyon, N . Mex., while commanding the right of a detachment of 19 men, on 12 August 1881, he stubbornly held his ground in an extremely exposed position and gallantly forced back a much superior number of the enemy, preventing them from surrounding the command.

See also

List of Medal of Honor recipients for the Indian Wars
List of African American Medal of Honor recipients

References

 

1847 births
1904 deaths
American people of the Indian Wars
United States Army Medal of Honor recipients
People from Williamson County, Tennessee
United States Army soldiers
Buffalo Soldiers
Burials at Fort McPherson National Cemetery
American Indian Wars recipients of the Medal of Honor